The Unattractive Revolution Tour (2007–2008) is a DVD released by the Swedish hard rock band Crashdïet. The main feature is a concert filmed at Klubben in Stockholm, Sweden 2007.

A disc with bonus material is also included.

Track listing - Disc 1
INTRO
IN THE RAW
QUEEN OBSCENE
LIKE A SIN
NEEDLE IN YOUR EYE
I DONT CARE
FALLING RAIN
RIOT IN EVERYONE
THRILL ME
KNOKK EM DOWN
IT´S A MIRACLE
TIKKET
XTC OVERDRIVE
BREAKIN THE CHAINZ

Bonus Material - Disc 2
INTRO
IN THE RAW - PHOTOSHOOT
PARK CHAT
PETER & OLLI
LIVE AT SWEDEN ROCK FESTIVAL
SRF SIGNING SESSION
IN THE RAW - VIDEO SHOOT
ALBUM PHOTOSHOOT
LIVE IN GERMANY
LIVE IN HELSINGBORG - SWEDEN
LIVE AT PEACE & LOVE FESTIVAL
HOTEL MADNESS
LIVE AT STICKY FINGERS - SWEDEN
LIVE IN FINLAND
MORE GERMANY
OLLI & HARDCORE SUPERSTAR LIVE
ERIC & HARDCORE SUPERSTAR LIVE
BACKSTAGE MADNESS
TOUR BUS MADNESS
TOUR MANAGER
SOUND GUY
LIVE - BRAZIL - SÃO PAULO
WARM-UP
LIVE AT TYROL SWEDEN
LIVE IN LISEBERGHALLEN - SWEDEN

Personnel
H. Olliver Twisted – lead vocals
Martin Sweet – guitars, backing vocals
Peter London – bass guitar, backing vocals
Eric Young - drums, backing vocals

Swedish-language films
Crashdïet video albums
2008 video albums
Live video albums
2008 live albums
2000s English-language films